The 26th Trampoline European Championships took place in Baku, Azerbaijan, from April 12 – April 15, 2018.

Medal summary

Seniors

Juniors

Medal table

References

External links

European Trampoline Championships
2018
International gymnastics competitions hosted by Azerbaijan
European Trampoline Championships
Sports competitions in Baku
European Trampoline Championships